Bubonic Burial Rites is an EP by Gnaw Their Tongues, independently released on November 21, 2007.

Track listing

Personnel
Adapted from the Bubonic Burial Rites liner notes.
 Maurice de Jong (as Mories) – vocals, instruments, recording, cover art

Release history

References

External links 
 

2007 EPs
Gnaw Their Tongues albums